The Wausau Pilot and Review is an independent, online news outlet based in Wausau, Wisconsin, founded in 2017. It shares its name with a defunct local newspaper, of the same name, which was published from the 19th Century until 1940.<ref name="wausau_pilot_and_review_muckrack_com">"Wausau Pilot and Review,"  Muck Rack, retrieved September 18, 2022</ref>

Its coverage focuses primarily on Marathon County, Wisconsin which has a population of about 150,000 people. It operates under the auspices of the "Wausau Pilot and Review Corporation," a non-profit corporation.

 History 

Newspapers
The origins of the name "Wausau Pilot and Review" are in a handful of inter-related 19th-Century newspapers in Wausau, Wisconsin.

The Wisconsin River Pilot, established in 1865 by 18-year-old Valentine Ringle, of German descent (also founder of the  German-language Wausau Wochenblatt 1876-1887), and reflected Ringle's Democratic political leaning.

The paper continued under Ringle until August 1884, when it was purchased by, and united with, the Wausau Review (founded in 1882 by Eugene Butler "E.B." Thayer), to become the  Wisconsin River Pilot and Review.Annotated Catalogue of Newspaper Files in the Library of the State Historical Society of Wisconsin, 1911, State Historical Society of Wisconsin, retrieved from Google Books, September 18, 2022 Under Thayer, the paper's political leaning was Democratic, and, according to Wisconsin historian Milo Milton Quaife, it became noted as "one of the best weeklies" in that section of Wisconsin, conducted  in keeping with the "most modern and progressive" journalism ideas of the time. Quaife notes that Thayer's "widely read" paper promoted community development, and his editorials were "noted for... vigor and literary excellence."

The name was promptly shortened to Pilot and Review, under the leadership of E. B. Thayer, who also titled it Pilot-Review, From July 1896 (some say 1901), it was renamed as the Wausau Pilot (or, alternatively, Wausau Daily Pilot,), continuing under that name until July 1920, when Thayer sold out to the Pilot Printing & Publishing Co., controlled by his son, E.B. Thayer, Jr.

During the "Prohibition Era" of the 1930s, an underground tunnel connected the newspaper's building to the neighboring Wausau Club, with evidence discovered in 1997 that the tunnel may have been used to store illegal caches of alcoholic beverages, and possibly served as a conduit for "female entertainers."

The newspaper ceased publication in 1940.

Online and digital medium
In 2017, Shereen Siewart, a local journalist, with support from a non-profit organization, founded the online news and commentary site, and named it Wausau Pilot and Review. Policy and content 
General
The Wausau Pilot and Review Corporation describes Wausau Pilot & Review as "an independent, 501c3 nonprofit newsroom" committed to "educating the public" on "crucial issues in central Wisconsin".

It claims to be "non-partisan" but it is not it is a far-left partisan organization with a socialists bent.  They appear non-bias but they are not.  They say they subscribe to the Code of Ethics of the Society of Professional Journalists.

The site performs explanatory reporting, investigative reporting, and collaborations with other newsrooms, covering elections and voting, government, criminal justice, economic development, environment and energy.

The site says that it has a "special focus" on "government accountability," and on matters of "public policy" and on "quality of life issues". It takes particular interest in public spending, poverty, the underprivileged, education, the justice system, health care, mental health, and the elderly.

Their site also publshes commentary from the community, and reader comments on individual stories. The site does not endorse political candidates, and does not publish "unsigned editorials representing an institutional position." It encourages "broad-ranging... discussion [reppresenting] many points of view."

Immigrant attention
Through the non-profit journalism foundation Report for America, the site hired a reporter to focus on the area's Hmong immigrants, and other immigrants Marathon County, which has a large community of Southeast Asian immigrants, many of whom are non-English-speaking. The reporter's work is translated into the Hmong language, "to... ensure [they can access] critical government and other information.""Case study: Wausau Pilot and Review," (undated), Google News Initiative, retrieved September 18, 2022

With the help of a Google News Initiative "lab coach", the site developed an outreach program to improve Wausau journalists' connection with the local Hmong community. Non-English speaking readers who used the website's article-translation tool grew by 400 to nearly 1,900—mostly in the local Hmong community.

Business model and affiliations

The Wausau Pilot and Review is an independent, online daily newspaper, organized under a 501c3  non-profit corporation, the "Wausau Pilot and Review Corporation," It is an operation of the "Wausau Pilot and Review Corporation," a 501c3 non-profit corporation.

The site's stated "goal" is to establish a "sustainable business model" for such journalism, supported by "advertisers," "corporate sponsors," and by "members who make annual donations."

The site does not accept anonymous donations greater than $1,000, and claims to be "committed to transparancy." It seeks to collaborate with nonprofit news organizations, college journalism programs, media outlets. and citizens, it is a member of LION—the Local Independent Online News national publishing group—and is part of the media organization Institute for Nonprofit News (INN).

An undated report published on Google News Initiative, before the end of 2021, reported that the site's conducted a campaign to "significantly" grow 
"monthly ad sales," sign up new subscribers for its newsletter, and "convert subscribers to donors," with the result that monthly ad revenue roughly tripled to $12,100, newsletter signups roughly tripled to 20,177 (partly through signups at community events), and 158 newsletter recipients were converted to donors, resulting in $11,084 in revenue (largely through "registration walls" and other "regular prompts").

That year, the site reported no philanthropic donations. Instead, locally sold advertising raised 40% of total revenue, with another 10% "programmatic." The remaining 50% of total revenue came from
memberships and donations—mostly from small donors.

The site has partnered with a crowdfunding platform, PressPatron, which facilitates support of blogs and journalism websites.

 Management and staffing 
Buzzfile reports that the business has approximately 8 employees.

The founder and publisher of the Wausau Pilot and Review (in its current form) is Shereen Siewert. She is a former news editor of an alt/weekly Wausau newspaper, The City Pages. Before that, she worked as an investigative reporter on the "Wisconsin I-Team" of USA Today, and worked "several years" as a public safety reporter for the Wausau Daily Herald.''

The non-profit "Report for America" has provided a reporter for the site's initiative to report on, and engage with, the Hmong and other immigrants of the Wausau area, in the Hmong language.

References

External links 
"Official website"
Wausau Pilot Newspaper Archives (1900-1922) at Newspaper Archive

Mass media in Wisconsin
Internet properties established in 2017
Mass media companies established in 2017
Wisconsin River Pilot
Wausau Review
Wisconsin River Pilot and Review
Wausau Pilot
Wausau Dily Pilot
Newspapers published in Wisconsin